L.A. Doctors is an American medical drama television series set in a Los Angeles primary care practice. It ran on CBS from September 21, 1998 to May 10, 1999. It replaced Brooklyn South after its cancellation in May 1998.

Premise
Four Los Angeles doctors run a practice in this drama that focuses as much on the problems in the American medical system as it does on the patients.

Cast
Ken Olin as Dr. Roger Cattan
Matt Craven as Dr. Tim Lonner
Rick Roberts as Dr. Evan Newman
Sheryl Lee as Dr. Sarah Church
Deirdre O'Connell as Suzanne Blum

Cancellation
The series was scheduled opposite ABC's Monday Night Football and NBC's Dateline Monday, and struggled in the ratings, leading up to the show's cancellation in May 1999

Episodes

Awards and nominations
The series won the 1999 People's Choice Award for Favorite New Dramatic Television Series.

References

External links 
 
 

1990s American drama television series
1998 American television series debuts
1999 American television series endings
1990s American medical television series
Television shows set in Los Angeles
Television series by CBS Studios
Television series by Sony Pictures Television
CBS original programming